Los Angeles County, officially the County of Los Angeles, and sometimes abbreviated as  L.A. County, is the most populous county in the United States, with 9,861,224 residents estimated in 2022. Its population is greater than that of 40 individual U.S. states. The county's seat, Los Angeles, is the second most populous city in the United States, with about 3.9 million residents.

History 

Los Angeles County is one of the original counties of California, created at the time of statehood in 1850. The county originally included parts of what are now Kern, San Bernardino, Riverside, Inyo, Tulare, Ventura, and Orange counties. In 1851 and 1852, Los Angeles County stretched from the coast to the state line of Nevada. As the population increased, sections were split off to organize San Bernardino County in 1853, Kern County in 1866, and Orange County in 1889.

Prior to the 1870s, Los Angeles County was divided into townships, many of which were amalgamations of one or more old ranchos. They were:
 Azusa (encompassed the foothill communities east of the San Gabriel River, including present-day Covina and Duarte)
 El Monte (encompassed communities in the Whittier Narrows area, including present-day El Monte, La Puente, as well as Monterey Park)
 Azusa and El Monte Townships were merged for the 1870 census.
 City of Los Angeles (then consisting solely of its four-league Spanish land grant)
 Los Angeles Township (consisted of areas surrounding the City of Los Angeles, including the San Fernando Valley and present-day West Los Angeles and East Los Angeles. Most of this area has now been annexed to the city of Los Angeles.)
 Los Nietos (consisted of areas south of the Whittier Narrows and Puente Hills south to present-day Long Beach, centered on the early settlement at Los Nietos. Some of this area is now in Orange County.)
 San Jose (consisted of the eastern portions of the county drained by San Jose Creek, including what is now the cities of Pomona, Claremont and Walnut)
 San Gabriel (consisted of the western San Gabriel Valley and foothill communities, including present-day Alhambra and Pasadena. Centered on the Mission San Gabriel)
 Santa Ana (consisted of what is now northern and central Orange County, including what is now Fullerton, Huntington Beach and the City of Orange. Centered on Santa Ana).
 For the 1870 census, Anaheim district was enumerated separately.
 San Juan (consisted of what is now southern Orange County. Centered on Mission San Juan Capistrano).
 San Pedro (consisted of the present-day South Bay communities, Compton and western Long Beach. Centered on the wharf of San Pedro. Renamed Wilmington Township by 1870).
 Tejon (consisted of all of northern Los Angeles County and what is now southern Kern County. Centered on Fort Tejon)
 When Kern County was formed, the portion of the township remaining in Los Angeles County became Soledad Township More recently, statewide droughts in California have further strained Los Angeles County’s water security.

Geography 

Los Angeles County borders  of coast on the Pacific Ocean and encompasses mountain ranges, valleys, forests, islands, lakes, rivers, and desert. The Los Angeles River, Rio Hondo, Ballona Creek, the San Gabriel River and the Santa Clara River flow in Los Angeles County, while the primary mountain ranges are the Santa Monica Mountains and the San Gabriel Mountains. The western extent of the Mojave Desert begins in the Antelope Valley, in the northeastern part of the county.

Most of the population of Los Angeles County resides in the south and southwest, with major population centers in the Los Angeles Basin, San Fernando Valley, and San Gabriel Valley. Other population centers are found in the Santa Clarita Valley, Pomona Valley, Crescenta Valley and Antelope Valley.

The county is divided west-to-east by the San Gabriel Mountains, which are part of the Transverse Ranges of southern California, and are contained mostly within the Angeles National Forest. Most of the county's highest peaks are in the San Gabriel Mountains, including Mount San Antonio  at the Los Angeles-San Bernardino county lines, Mount Baden-Powell , Mount Burnham  and Mount Wilson . Several lower mountains are in the northern, western, and southwestern parts of the county, including the San Emigdio Mountains, the southernmost part of Tehachapi Mountains and the Sierra Pelona Mountains.

Los Angeles County includes San Clemente Island and Santa Catalina Island, which are part of the Channel Islands archipelago off the Pacific Coast.

Lakes and reservoirs 

 Bouquet Reservoir
 Castaic Lake
 Crystal Lake
 Elizabeth Lake
 Holiday Lake
 Hollywood Reservoir
 Hughes Lake
 Jackson Lake
 Las Virgenes Reservoir
 Malibou Lake
 Morris Reservoir
 Munz Lakes
 Lake Palmdale
 Puddingstone Reservoir
 Pyramid Lake
 Quail Lake
 Silver Lake Reservoir
 Stone Canyon Reservoir
 Tweedy Lake
 Westlake in City of Westlake Village
 Lake Lindero

Major divisions of the county 
 East: Eastside, San Gabriel Valley, portions of the Pomona Valley
 West: Westside, Beach Cities
 South: South Bay, South Los Angeles,  Palos Verdes Peninsula, Gateway Cities, Los Angeles Harbor Region
 North: San Fernando Valley, Crescenta Valley, portions of the Conejo Valley, portions of the Antelope Valley and Santa Clarita Valley
 Central: Downtown Los Angeles, Mid-Wilshire, Northeast Los Angeles

National protected areas 
 Angeles National Forest (part)
 Los Padres National Forest (part)
 Santa Monica Mountains National Recreation Area (part)

Climate 
Many parts of the state are quite dry. There is rainfall and snowfall especially in the wintertime.

Demographics

2020 Census

Note: the US Census treats Hispanic/Latino as an ethnic category. This table excludes Latinos from the racial categories and assigns them to a separate category. Hispanics/Latinos can be of any race.

In 2019, the median household income in the county was $72,797.

2010 Census
Los Angeles County had a population of 9,818,605 in the 2010 United States Census. This includes a natural increase since the last census of 583,364 people (i.e., 1,152,564 births minus 569,200 deaths) and a decrease due to net migration of 361,895 people. Immigration resulted in a net increase of 293,433 people, and migration from within the United States resulted in a net decrease of 655,328 people.

The racial makeup of Los Angeles County was 4,936,599 (50%) White, 1,346,865 (13.7%) Asian, 856,874 (9%) African American, 72,828 (0.7%) Native American,  26,094 (0.3%) Pacific Islander, 2,140,632 (21.8%) from other races, and 438,713 (4.5%) from two or more races.

Non-Hispanic whites numbered 2,728,321, or 28% of the population. Hispanic or Latino residents of any race numbered 4,687,889 (48%); 36% of Los Angeles County's population was of Mexican ancestry, 3.7% Salvadoran, and 2.2% Guatemalan heritage.

The county has a large population of Asian Americans, being home to the largest numbers of Burmese, Cambodian, Chinese, Filipino,  Indonesian, Korean, Sri Lankan, Taiwanese, and Thai outside their respective countries. The largest Asian groups in Los Angeles County are 4.0% Chinese, 3.3% Filipino, 2.2% Korean, 1.0% Japanese, 0.9% Vietnamese, 0.8% Indian, and 0.3% Cambodian.

Racial and Ethnic Composition since 1960

Race and ancestry 

The racial makeup of the county is 48.7% White, 11.0% African American, 0.8% Native American, 10.0% Asian, 0.3% Pacific Islander, 23.5% from other races, and 4.9% from two or more races. 44.6% of the population are Hispanic or Latino of any race. The largest European-American ancestry groups are German (6%), Irish (5%), English (4%) and Italian (3%). 45.9% of the population reported speaking only English at home; 37.9% spoke Spanish, 2.22% Tagalog, 2.0% Chinese, 1.9% Korean, 1.87% Armenian, 0.5% Arabic, and 0.2% Hindi.

The county has the largest Native American population of any county in the nation: according to the 2000 census, it has more than 153,550 people of indigenous descent, and most are from Latin America.

As estimated by the Public Policy Institute of California in 2008, Los Angeles County is home to more than one-third of California's undocumented immigrants, who make up more than ten percent of the population.

Los Angeles County is home to the largest Armenian population outside of Armenia.

Los Angeles County contains the largest Iranian population outside of Iran of any other county or county equivalent globally.

2000 

At the 2000 census, there were 9,519,338 people, 3,133,774 households, and 2,137,233 families in the county.

Of the 3,133,774 households 37% had children under the age of 18 living with them, 48% were married couples living together, 15% had a female householder with no husband present, and 32% were non-families. 25% of households were one person and 7% were one person aged 65 or older.  The average household size was 2.98 and the average family size was 3.61.

The age distribution was 28% under the age of 18, 10% from 18 to 24, 33% from 25 to 44, 19% from 45 to 64, and 10% 65 or older.  The median age was 32 years. For every 100 females, there were 97.7 males.  For every 100 females age 18 and over, there were 95.0 males.

Income 

The median personal earnings for all workers 16 and older in Los Angeles County are $30,654, slightly below the US median; earnings, however vary widely by neighborhood, race and ethnicity, and gender. The median household income was $42,189 and the median family income  was $46,452. Males had a median income of $36,299 versus $30,981 for females. The per capita income for the county was $20,683. There are 14.4% of families living below the poverty line and 17.9% of the population, including 24.2% of under 18 and 10.5% of those over 64.
Los Angeles County has the highest number of millionaires of any county in the nation, totaling 261,081 households as of 2007.

The homeownership rate is 47.9%, and the median value for houses is $409,300. 42.2% of housing units are in multi-unit structures. Los Angeles County has the largest number of homeless people, with "48,000 people living on the streets, including 6,000 veterans," in 2010.
 the number of homeless people in the county increased to nearly 58,000.

Religion 
In 2015, there were over two thousand Christian churches, the majority of which are Catholic. Roman Catholic adherents number close to 40% of the population. There were 202 Jewish synagogues, 145 Buddhist temples, 38 Muslim mosques, 44 Baháʼí Faith worship centers, 37 Hindu temples, 28 Tenrikyo churches and fellowships, 16 Shinto worship centers, and 14 Sikh gurdwaras in the county. The Roman Catholic Archdiocese of Los Angeles has approximately 5 million members and is the largest diocese in the United States. In 2014, the county had 3,275 religious organizations, the most out of all US counties.

Law, government, and politics

Government 

The Government of Los Angeles County is defined and authorized under the California Constitution, California law and the Charter of the County of Los Angeles. Much of the Government of California is in practice the responsibility of local governments such as the Government of Los Angeles County.

The county's voters elect a governing five-member Los Angeles County Board of Supervisors.  The small size of the board means each supervisor represents over 2 million people. The board operates in a legislative, executive, and quasi-judicial capacity. As a legislative authority, it can pass ordinances for the unincorporated areas (ordinances that affect the whole county, like posting of restaurant ratings, must be ratified by the individual city). As an executive body, it can tell the county departments what to do, and how to do it. As a quasi-judicial body, the Board is the final venue of appeal in the local planning process, and holds public hearings on various agenda items.

As of 2020, the Board of Supervisors oversees a $35.5 billion annual budget and over 112,000 employees. The county government is managed on a day-to-day basis by a Chief Executive Officer and is organized into many departments, each of which is enormous in comparison to equivalent county-level (and even many state-level) departments anywhere else in the United States. Some of the larger or better-known departments include:

 Los Angeles County Department of Consumer and Business Affairs – offers consumers in the county a variety of services including: consumer and real estate counseling, mediation, and small claims counseling investigates consumer complaints, real estate fraud and identity theft issues. The department also provides small business certifications and  helps entrepreneurs navigate the process of opening a business.
 Los Angeles County Department of Children and Family Services – administers foster care
 Los Angeles County Fire Department – provides firefighting services for the unincorporated parts of Los Angeles County, as well as 58 cities.
 Los Angeles County Department of Health Services – operates several county hospitals and a network of primary care clinics,
 Los Angeles County Department of Public Health – administers public health programs including STD programs, smoking cessation, and restaurant inspection. In the majority of the county LACDPH puts letter grades relating to the food cleanliness and safety of a restaurant in the front window of restaurants.
 Los Angeles County Department of Public Social Services – administers many federal and state welfare programs
 Los Angeles County Department of Public Works – operates countywide flood control system, constructs and maintains roads in unincorporated areas
 Los Angeles County District Attorney – prosecutes criminal suspects.
 Los Angeles County Office of the Public Defender – Defends indigent people accused of criminal offenses.
 Los Angeles County Probation Department
 Los Angeles County Sheriff's Department – provides law enforcement services for the unincorporated parts of Los Angeles County, as well as 42 cities.

The Los Angeles County Metropolitan Transportation Authority, despite its name, is  a County department. Technically it is a state-mandated county transportation commission that also operates bus and rail.

Politics

Overview

Voter registration 

In the United States House of Representatives, Los Angeles County is split between 18 congressional districts: In the California State Senate, Los Angeles County is split between 15 legislative districts:
In the California State Assembly, Los Angeles County is split between 24 legislative districts:

On November 4, 2008, Los Angeles County was almost evenly split over Proposition 8, which amended the California Constitution to ban same-sex marriages. The county voted for the amendment 50.04% with a margin of 2,385 votes.

Legal system 

The Los Angeles County Superior Court is the county's court of general jurisdiction, while the U.S. District Court for the Central District of California may hear cases where federal jurisdiction is present. Both are headquartered in a large cluster of government buildings in the city's Civic Center.

Historically, the courthouses were county-owned buildings that were maintained at county expense, which created significant friction since the trial court judges, as officials of the state government, had to lobby the county Board of Supervisors for facility renovations and upgrades. In turn, the state judiciary successfully persuaded the state Legislature to authorize the transfer of all courthouses to the state government in 2008 and 2009 (so that judges would have direct control over their own courthouses). Courthouse security is still provided by the county government under a contract with the state.

Unlike the largest city in the United States, New York City, all of the city of Los Angeles and most of its important suburbs are located within a single county. As a result, both the county superior court and the federal district court are respectively the busiest courts of their type in the nation.

Many celebrities have been seen in Los Angeles courts. In 2003, the television show Extra (based in nearby Glendale) found itself running so many reports on the legal problems of local celebrities that it spun them off into a separate show, Celebrity Justice.

State cases are appealed to the Court of Appeal for the Second Appellate District, which is also headquartered in the Civic Center, and then to the California Supreme Court, which is headquartered in San Francisco but also hears argument in Los Angeles (again, in the Civic Center). Federal cases are appealed to the Court of Appeals for the Ninth Circuit, which hears them at its branch building in Pasadena. The court of last resort for federal cases is the U.S. Supreme Court in Washington, D.C.

Crime 
The following table includes the number of incidents reported and the rate per 1,000 persons for each type of offense.

Cities by population and crime rates

Other statistics 
Crime in 2013
 Homicides: 386
 Thefts: 54,971 
 Burglaries: 17,606
 Car Thefts: 15,866
 Robberies: 10,202
 Violent Crimes: 20,318
 Rapes: 843
 Assaults: 8,976
 Murders: 297

Ecology

According to the authors of Wild L.A., a book about urban biodiversity, “Los Angeles is the birdiest county in the country with over 500 recorded species.” L.A.’s amenable climate supports a large number of introduced, tropical and migratory species. Because of the county’s wide range of biomes it is possible to see desert bighorn sheep and green sea turtles in the same day, without crossing the county line. The range of habitats in the county is “greater than in many states, with mountains, wetlands, desert, ocean, meadows and chaparral, each with its own endemic species.”

Statewide droughts in California have placed a strain on the county's water security.

Economy
.

Los Angeles County is commonly associated with the entertainment and digital media industry; all five major film studios—Paramount Pictures, Sony Pictures, Warner Bros., Universal Pictures, and Walt Disney Studios—are located within the county. Numerous other major industries also define the economy of Los Angeles County, including international trade supported by the Port of Los Angeles and the Port of Long Beach, music recording and production, aerospace and defense, fashion, and professional services such as law, medicine, engineering and design services, financial services. High-tech sector employment within Los Angeles County is 368,500 workers, and manufacturing employment within Los Angeles County is 365,000 workers.

The following major companies have headquarters in Los Angeles County:

Education 
The Los Angeles County Office of Education provides a supporting role for school districts in the area. The county office also operates two magnet schools, the International Polytechnic High School and Los Angeles County High School for the Arts. There are a number of private schools in the county, most notably those operated by the  Roman Catholic Archdiocese. The county's public education sector is run by numerous school districts with the Los Angeles Unified School District being the largest one running public schools primarily within the city of Los Angeles and it's immediately neighboring cities.

Colleges 

 Antelope Valley College, Lancaster
 Art Center College of Design, Pasadena
 The Art Institute of California – Los Angeles (AICALA), Santa Monica
 Azusa Pacific University, Azusa
 Biola University, La Mirada
 California Institute of the Arts, Santa Clarita
 Cerritos College, Norwalk
 Citrus College, Glendora
 Claremont Colleges, Claremont
 Claremont McKenna College
 Harvey Mudd College
 Pitzer College
 Pomona College
 Scripps College
 Claremont School of Theology, Claremont
 College of the Canyons, Santa Clarita
 DeVry University, Long Beach and West Hills (Los Angeles)
 East Los Angeles College, Monterey Park
 El Camino College, Torrance
 Fuller Theological Seminary, Pasadena
 Glendale Community College, Glendale
 Hebrew Union College, Los Angeles
 ITT Technical Institute, Culver City, San Dimas, Sylmar (Los Angeles), Torrance, and West Covina
 Life Pacific College, San Dimas
 Long Beach City College, Long Beach
 Los Angeles City College (LACC), Los Angeles
 Los Angeles Harbor College, Los Angeles
 Los Angeles Mission College, Sylmar (Los Angeles)
 Los Angeles Music Academy College of Music, Pasadena
 Los Angeles Pierce College (Pierce), Woodland Hills (Los Angeles)
 Los Angeles Southwest College, Los Angeles
 Los Angeles Trade Technical College (LATTC), Los Angeles
 Los Angeles Valley College, Valley Glen (Los Angeles)
 The Master's University, Santa Clarita
 Mount St. Mary's College, Los Angeles
 Mt. San Antonio College, Walnut
 Mt. Sierra College, Monrovia
 Occidental College (Oxy), Eagle Rock (Los Angeles)
 Otis College of Art and Design, Westchester (Los Angeles)
 Pacific Oaks College, Pasadena
 Pasadena City College, Pasadena
 Pepperdine University, Malibu
 Rio Hondo College, Whittier
 Santa Monica College (SMC), Santa Monica
 West Los Angeles College, Culver City
 Whittier College, Whittier
 Wyoming Technical Institute (WyoTech), Long Beach

Universities 

 Abraham Lincoln University (ALU), Los Angeles
 Alliant International University (AIU), Alhambra
 American Jewish University (AJULA), Los Angeles
 Azusa Pacific University, Azusa
 Biola University, La Mirada
 California Institute of Technology (Caltech), Pasadena
 California State Polytechnic University, Pomona (Cal Poly Pomona), Pomona
 California State University, Dominguez Hills (CSUDH), Carson
 California State University, Long Beach (CSULB), Long Beach
 California State University, Los Angeles (CSULA), Los Angeles
 California State University, Northridge (CSUN), Northridge (Los Angeles)
 Charles R. Drew University of Medicine and Science (Los Angeles)
 Claremont Graduate University (CGU), Claremont
 Loyola Marymount University (LMU), Westchester (Los Angeles)
 National University, Los Angeles and Woodland Hills
 Pepperdine University, Malibu
 Southern California University of Health Sciences, Whittier
 Southern California Institute of Architecture (SCI-Arc), Los Angeles
 Southwestern University School of Law, Los Angeles
 University of Antelope Valley (UAV), Lancaster
 University of California, Los Angeles (UCLA), Westwood (Los Angeles)
 University of La Verne, La Verne
 University of Southern California (USC), Los Angeles
 University of the West (UWest), Rosemead
 Western University of Health Sciences (WesternU), Pomona
 Woodbury University, Burbank

K-12 schools

Sites of interest 

The county's most visited park is Griffith Park, owned by the city of Los Angeles. The county is also known for the annual Rose Parade in Pasadena, the annual Los Angeles County Fair in Pomona, the Los Angeles County Museum of Art, the Los Angeles Zoo, the Natural History Museum of Los Angeles County, the La Brea Tar Pits, the Arboretum of Los Angeles, and two horse racetracks and two car racetracks (Pomona Raceway and Irwindale Speedway), also the  located in Long Beach, and the Long Beach Grand Prix, and miles of beaches—from Zuma to Cabrillo.

Venice Beach is a popular attraction whose Muscle Beach used to attract throngs of tourists admiring "hardbodies".  Today, it is more arts-centered. Santa Monica's pier is a well known tourist spot, famous for its Ferris wheel and bumper car rides, which were featured in the introductory segment of the television sitcom Three's Company. Further north in Pacific Palisades one finds the beaches used in the television series Baywatch. The fabled Malibu, home of many film and television stars, lies west of it.

In the mountain, canyon, and desert areas one may find Vasquez Rocks Natural Area Park, where many old Westerns were filmed. Mount Wilson Observatory in the San Gabriel Mountains is open for the public to view astronomical stars from its telescope, now computer-assisted.  Many county residents find relaxation in water skiing and swimming at Castaic Lake Recreation Area – the county's largest park by area – as well as enjoying natural surroundings and starry nights at Saddleback Butte State Park in the eastern Antelope Valley – California State Parks' largest in area within the county. The California Poppy Reserve is located in the western Antelope Valley and shows off the State's flower in great quantity on its rolling hills every spring.

Museums 
 Armory Center for the Arts, Pasadena, California
 Battleship USS Iowa, Los Angeles Waterfront in San Pedro
 , Los Angeles Waterfront in San Pedro, just south of the USS Iowa
 California African American Museum
 California Science Center, Los Angeles (formerly the Museum of Science and Industry)
 The Broad
 Hammer Museum
 Huntington Library, San Marino
 Long Beach Museum of Art in the historic Elizabeth Milbank Anderson residence
 Los Angeles Children's Museum
 Los Angeles County Fire Museum, in Bellflower
 Los Angeles County Museum of Art, Mid-City, Los Angeles
 Museum of Contemporary Art, Downtown Los Angeles (founded in 1950); The Geffen Contemporary at MOCA, Downtown Los Angeles (founded in 1980)
 Museum of Jurassic Technology, Culver City
 Museum of Latin American Art in Long Beach
 Museum of Neon Art
 Museum of the American West (Gene Autry Museum), in Griffith Park
 Museum of Tolerance
 Natural History Museum of Los Angeles County
 Pasadena Museum of California Art, in Pasadena
 J. Paul Getty Center, Brentwood (Ancient Roman, Greek, and European Renaissance Art)
 J. Paul Getty Villa, Pacific Palisades, Getty's original house
 George C. Page Museum at La Brea Tar Pits
 Santa Monica Museum of Art, Santa Monica (Contemporary art)
 Norton Simon Museum, Pasadena (19th- and early 20th-century art)
 Skirball Cultural Center, Los Angeles
 Southwest Museum

Entertainment 
 Los Angeles Memorial Coliseum
 Descanso Gardens
 Dodger Stadium
 Exposition Park
 Farmers Market
  The Forum
 Griffith Park
 Griffith Observatory
 Huntington Botanical Gardens
 La Brea Tar Pits
 Music Center
 Olvera Street
 Crypto.com Arena
 SoFi Stadium
 South Coast Botanic Garden
 Third Street Promenade
 Venice Beach
 Los Angeles Zoo

Music venues 

 California Plaza, comprising One California Plaza and Two California Plaza
 Cerritos Center for the Performing Arts
 Crypto.com Arena
 The Forum
 Disney Concert Hall
 Greek Theatre
 House of Blues Sunset Strip
 Pantages Theatre
 Hollywood Bowl
 Hollywood Palladium
 John Anson Ford Amphitheatre
 The Orpheum Theatre
 The Roxy Theatre
 Royce Hall (UCLA)
 The Music Box
 El Rey Theatre
 The Troubadour
 The Wiltern
 Whisky a Go Go

Amusement parks 
 Universal Studios Hollywood
 Raging Waters, San Dimas
 Six Flags Magic Mountain
 Six Flags Hurricane Harbor
 Pacific Park

Other attractions

Other areas 

 Ridge Route
 Angeles National Forest
 Mount Wilson Observatory
 Malibu Creek State Park
 Vasquez Rocks Natural Area Park
 Plant 42's Blackbird Airpark and Heritage Airpark
 Antelope Valley California Poppy Reserve
 Cortes Bank
 Santa Catalina Island
 Mojave Desert
 Saddleback Butte State Park
 Antelope Valley Indian Museum State Historic Park
 Arthur B. Ripley Desert Woodland State Park

Transportation

Major highways

Air 

Los Angeles International Airport (LAX), located in the Westchester district, is the primary commercial airport for commercial airlines in the county and the Greater Los Angeles Area. LAX is operated by Los Angeles World Airports (LAWA), an agency of the City of Los Angeles.

Other important commercial airports in Los Angeles County include:
 Long Beach Municipal Airport operated by the City of Long Beach.
 Bob Hope Airport in Burbank, operated by the Burbank-Glendale-Pasadena Airport Authority.

The following general aviation airports also are located in Los Angeles County:
 County operated airports (Department of Public Works, Aviation Division)
 Compton/Woodley Airport in Compton.
 San Gabriel Valley Airport in El Monte.
 Brackett Field in La Verne.
 Whiteman Airport in Pacoima.
 General William J. Fox Airfield in Lancaster.
 City operated airports
 Van Nuys Airport in Van Nuys, also operated by LAWA. Van Nuys Airport sees significant executive jet air traffic.
 LA/Palmdale Regional Airport in Palmdale. The airport is a separate facility on the grounds of Air Force Plant 42.
 Santa Monica Airport in Santa Monica, which has major executive jet traffic.
 Hawthorne Municipal Airport, also known as Jack Northrop Field, in Hawthorne.
 Zamperini Field in Torrance.

The U.S. Air Force operates three airports in Los Angeles County:
 Portions of Edwards Air Force Base, located at the northern edge of the county.
 Air Force Plant 42 in Palmdale, sharing runways with LA/Palmdale Regional.
 The non-flying Los Angeles Air Force Base in El Segundo.

Rail 
Los Angeles is a major freight-railroad transportation center, largely due to the large volumes of freight moving in and out of the county's sea port facilities.  The ports are connected to the downtown rail yards and to the main lines of Union Pacific and Burlington Northern Santa Fe headed east via a grade-separated, freight rail corridor known as the Alameda Corridor.

Passenger rail service is provided in the county by Amtrak, Los Angeles Metro Rail and Metrolink.

Amtrak has the following intercity Amtrak service at Union Station in the city of Los Angeles:
 The Pacific Surfliner to Santa Barbara, San Luis Obispo, and San Diego.
 The Coast Starlight to San Francisco Bay Area, Portland and Seattle.
 The Southwest Chief to Albuquerque, Kansas City and Chicago.
 The Sunset Limited to Tucson, Houston and New Orleans.

Union Station is also the primary hub for Metrolink commuter rail, which serves much of the Greater Los Angeles Area.

Light rail, subway (heavy rail), and long-distance bus service are all provided by the Los Angeles County Metropolitan Transportation Authority (Metro). Other smaller regional transit agencies that provide public transit to specific regions of Los Angeles County include LADOT, Long Beach Transit, Montebello Bus Lines, Norwalk Transit, Santa Monica's Big Blue Bus serving the western LA region , Santa Clarita Transit, Torrance Transit, Glendale Beeline, Foothill Transit serving the San Gabriel Valley region, and the Antelope Valley Transit Authority serving the Lancaster and Palmdale area in the Antelope Valley region.

Sea 
The county's two main seaports are the Port of Los Angeles and the Port of Long Beach. Together they handle over a quarter of all container traffic entering the United States, making the complex the largest and most important port in the country, and the third-largest port in the world by shipping volume.

The Port of Los Angeles is the largest cruise ship center on the West Coast, handling more than 1 million passengers annually.

The Port of Long Beach is home to the Sea Launch program, which uses a floating launch platform to insert payloads into orbits that would be difficult to attain from existing land-based launch sites.

Catalina Express ferries link the Catalina Island city of Avalon to the mainland at San Pedro and Long Beach, as well as Dana Point in Orange County.

Communities

Cities 

There are 88 incorporated cities in Los Angeles County. According to the 2018 Estimate, the most populous are:

Unincorporated areas

Census designated places 

 Acton
 Agua Dulce
 Alondra Park
 Altadena
 Avocado Heights
 Castaic
 Charter Oak
 Citrus
 Del Aire
 Desert View Highlands
 East Los Angeles
 East Pasadena
 East Rancho Dominguez
 East San Gabriel
 East Whittier
 Elizabeth Lake
 Florence-Graham
 Green Valley
 Hacienda Heights
 Hasley Canyon
 La Crescenta-Montrose
 Ladera Heights
 Lake Hughes
 Lake Los Angeles
 Lennox
 Leona Valley
 Littlerock
 Marina del Rey
 Mayflower Village
 North El Monte
 Pepperdine University
 Quartz Hill
 Rose Hills
 Rowland Heights
 San Pasqual
 South Monrovia Island
 South San Gabriel
 South San Jose Hills
 South Whittier
 Stevenson Ranch
 Sun Village
 Topanga
 Val Verde
 Valinda
 View Park-Windsor Hills
 Vincent
 Walnut Park
 West Athens
 West Carson
 West Rancho Dominguez
 West Puente Valley
 West Whittier-Los Nietos
 Westmont
 Willowbrook

Unincorporated Communities 

 Agoura
 Alla
 Alpine
 Andrade Corner
 Antelope Acres
 Antelope Center
 Athens
 Bassett
 Big Pines
 Castaic Junction
 City Terrace
 Cornell
 Del Sur
 Del Valle
 Firestone Park
 Florence
 Gorman
 Hillgrove
 Hi Vista
 Indian Springs
 Juniper Hills
 Kagel Canyon
 Kinneloa Mesa
 Largo Vista
 Llano
 Los Nietos
 Malibu Vista
 Monte Nido
 Neenach
 Ninetynine Oaks
 Pearblossom
 Rancho Dominguez
 Sandberg
 Sand Canyon
 Seminole Hot Springs
 Three Points
 Two Harbors
 Universal City
 Valyermo
 West Whitter

Proposed Communities 
 Centennial (planned for 70,000).

See: Los Angeles Almanac MAP: Unincorporated Areas and Communities of Los Angeles County

Population ranking 
The population ranking of the following table is based on the 2020 census of Los Angeles County.

† county seat

See also 

 List of museums in Los Angeles
 List of museums in Los Angeles County, California
 List of school districts in Los Angeles County, California
 List of schools in the Roman Catholic Archdiocese of Los Angeles
 National Register of Historic Places listings in Los Angeles County, California

Notes

References

External links 

 
 Los Angeles Tourism & Convention Board

 
California counties
Los Angeles metropolitan area
.
Counties in Southern California
1850 establishments in California
Populated places established in 1850
Majority-minority counties in California